Papa's Dream is a children's album by Los Lobos with Lalo Guerrero, released in 1995 through Music for Little People/Warner Bros. It features, among others, the Children's Coro of Los Cenzontles Musical Arts Center of San Pablo, California.

Track listing

Note
Even numbered tracks 2–14 and odd numbered tracks 15–31 are untitled and narration only.

Personnel

Los Lobos with Lalo Guerrero 
 David Hidalgo – guitar, vocals, accordion, violin, drums, hidalgarron, requinto jarocho, guitarrón jarocho      
 Cesar Rosas – vocals, guitar, vihuela jarana
 Conrad Lozano – bass, guitarrón
 Louie Pérez – drums, jarana
 Steve Berlin – saxophone, keyboards
 Lalo Guerrero –  narration, vocals, lead vocals (13, 20)

Additional musicians
 Victor Bisetti – percussion
 Gilberto Gutierrez – jarana, mosquito, zapateado (1)
 Jimmy Durchslag – trombone (26)
 Mark Guerrero – backing vocals (28)
 Hugo Arroyo – vocals (18, 28)
 Anne Danzer – vocals (26)
 Victoria Fernandez-McRorie – narration
 Herman Obregon – narration, backing vocals (22)
 Carmen Navarro – narration
 Fauna Dillon-Ostrow – narration
 Iona Dillon-Ostrow – narration
 Johanna Perez – narration
 Kai Ostrow – narration
 Nancy Esteva – narration
 Walter Emilio Perez – narration
 Los Cenzontles Children's Coro – vocals
 Eugene Rodriguez – choir conductor, backing vocals (3, 28)

Production
 Los Lobos – producer 
 Eugene Rodriguez – producer  
 Leib Ostrow – producer    
 David Wells – engineer
 Cesar Rosas – engineer, mixing
 Phred Cirillo – engineer
 Michael Prince – mixing
 Warren Dennis – mixing, mastering 
 Chip Dunbar – mastering 
 Jim Fulton – narration assembly
 Tanya Mayo – narration coordinator
 Al Carlos Hernandez – story creation, writing
 Phillip Rodriguez – story creation, writing
 Sandy Bassett – art direction, design 
 Rafael Lopez – illustration

References

1995 albums
Los Lobos albums
Children's music albums